Chen Xuejun (5 March 1919 – 4 July 2017) was a Chinese physicist. He was a thermal power engineering scientist, professor and former vice president of Xi'an Jiaotong University. He graduated from National Central University with a bachelor's degree in engineering. He studied in the graduate school of Purdue University in the United States. He was an academician of the Chinese Academy of Sciences and of The World Academy of Sciences.

References

External links

1919 births
2017 deaths
Educators from Anhui
Members of the Chinese Academy of Sciences
National Central University alumni
People from Chuzhou
Physicists from Anhui
Purdue University alumni
TWAS fellows
Academic staff of Xi'an Jiaotong University